Ursula Schulte (born 9 August 1952) is a German politician of the Social Democratic Party (SPD) who served as a member of the Bundestag from the state of North Rhine-Westphalia from 2013 until 2021.

Political career 
Schulte became a member of the Bundestag in the 2013 German federal election. In parliament, she was a member of the Committee on Food and Agriculture and the Committee on Family, Senior Citizens, Women and Youth.

In July 2020, Schulte announced that she would not stand in the 2021 federal elections but instead resign from active politics by the end of the parliamentary term.

References

External links 

  
 Bundestag biography 

1952 births
Living people
Members of the Bundestag for North Rhine-Westphalia
Female members of the Bundestag
21st-century German women politicians
Members of the Bundestag 2017–2021
Members of the Bundestag 2013–2017
Members of the Bundestag for the Social Democratic Party of Germany